For main article please see: AFL Army Award

The Australian Football League celebrates the best act of selflessness or one percenter of the season through the annual AFL Army Award competition.

Nominations and winners

Finalists 
 Luke Ball – round 3
 Martin Mattner – round 6
 Brad Green – round 12
 Nathan Eagleton – round 15
 Jacob Surjan – round 16
 Winner: Tom Hawkins – round 22

See also 
 AFL Army Award
 2009 AFL Goal of the Year
 2009 AFL Mark of the Year
 2009 AFL season

External links 
 AFL Army Award

Australian Football League Awards Seasons Voting
Army Award